SS Ceylan was a passenger ship of the French shipping company Compagnie des Chargeurs Réunis, which entered service in 1907 and was scrapped in 1934. In January 1920 she rescued 34 survivors of the passenger ship , which had sunk in a storm in the Bay of Biscay.

Construction
The 8223-ton steamship Ceylan was built at the Swan Hunter & Wigham Richardson shipyard in Wallsend, England for the French shipping company Compagnie des Chargeurs Réunis. Launched on 13 August 1907, she was completed in December that year.

Service
On 11 January 1920 the Ceylan, under the command of Captain Juan, went to the assistance of the Afrique, which with 609 passengers and crew members on board, had run onto a reef in the Bay of Biscay. Because of the stormy seas the Ceylan could not approach the Afrique but was able to rescue two of her lifeboats, which together had 34 people in them. These 34 people, including four women, were the only survivors of the disaster. They were brought ashore by the Ceylan.

Scrapping
The Ceylan, after 27 years' service, arrived at La Spezia Italy on 21 March 1934 to be scrapped.

References

External links
 report on the sinking of the  Afrique  and the bailout of  Ceylan  (French)
 report in the New York Times on the efforts of  Ceylan  from January 15, 1920

1907 ships
Steamships of France
Ships built on the River Tyne
Merchant ships of France
Passenger ships of France